Vesicomyidae is a family of saltwater clams, marine bivalve molluscs in the superfamily Glossoidea.

Genera and species
Genera, and some selected species, within the family Vesicomyidae are:
 Subfamily Pliocardiinae Woodring, 1925
 Abyssogena Krylova, Sahling & R. Janssen, 2010
 Archivesica Dall, 1908
 Austrogena Krylova, Sellanes, F. Valdés & D'Elía, 2014
 Callogonia Dall, 1889
 Calyptogena Dall, 1891
 Calyptogena magnifica
 Calyptogena pacifica Dall, 1891
 Christineconcha Krylova & Cosel, 2011
 † Cytherocardia Sacco, 1900 
 Ectenagena Woodring, 1938
 Elenaconcha Cosel & Olu, 2009
 † Hubertschenckia Takeda, 1953 
 Isorropodon Sturany, 1896
 Laubiericoncha von Cosel & Olu, 2008
 Laubiericoncha angulata (Dall, 1896) (formerly in Vesicomya)
 Laubiericoncha chuni (Thiele & Jaeckel, 1931) (formerly in Vesicomya)
 Laubiericoncha myriamae von Cosel & Olu, 2008
 Laubiericoncha suavis (Dall, 1913) (formerly in Vesicomya)
 Laubiericoncha sp. 'Edison Seamount'
 Laubiericoncha sp. 'Gakkel Ridge'
 † Notocalyptogena Amano, Saether, C. Little & K.A. Campbell, 2014
 Phreagena Woodring, 1938
 Pleurophopsis Van Winkle, 1919 (fossil, nomen dubium, sometimes included in Calyptogena)
 "Pleurophopsis" peruviana Olsson, 1931 (fossil)
 "Pleurophopsis" unioides Van Winkle, 1919 (fossil)
 Pliocardia Woodring, 1925
 Turneroconcha Krylova & Sahling, 2020
 Waisiuconcha Beets, 1942
 Wareniconcha Cosel & Olu, 2009
 Subfamily Vesicomyinae Dall & Simpson, 1901
 Vesicomya Dall, 1886
 Vesicomya atlantica (E. A. Smith, 1885)
 Vesicomya bruuni Filatova, 1969
 Vesicomya caribbea Boss, 1967
 Vesicomya cordata Boss, 1968
 Vesicomya gigas (Dall, 1896)
 Vesicomya leeana (Dall, 1889)
 Vesicomya lepta (Dall, 1896)
 Vesicomya ovalis (Dall, 1896)
 Vesicomya pilula (Dall, 1881)
 Vesicomya smithii Dall, 1889
 Vesicomya stearnsii (Dall, 1895)
 Vesicomya vesica (Dall, 1886)

Synonyms
 † Adulomya Kuroda, 1931 (includes Ectenagenasynonym of Pleurophopsis)
 † Adulomya elongata (Dall, 1916)
 † Adulomya extenta (Krylova & Moskalev, 1996)
 † Adulomya phaseoliformis (Métivier, Okutani & Ohta, 1986)
 † Adulomya kaikoi (Okutani & Métivier, 1986)
 † Adulomya uchimuraensis Kuroda, 1931 : synonym of † Pleurophopsis uchimuraensis (Kuroda, 1931)  (original combination)
 Akebiconcha Kuroda, 1943: synonym of Archivesica Dall, 1908
 Laubiericoncha Cosel & Olu, 2008: synonym of Archivesica Dall, 1908
 Pleurophoropsis Cossmann, 1920: synonym of Pleurophopsis van Winkle, 1919 (unjustified emendation of Pleurophopsis)

References

 Bieler, R.; Carter, J. G.; Coan, E. V. (2010). Classification of Bivalve families. Pp. 113-133, in: Bouchet P. & Rocroi J.-P. (2010), Nomenclator of Bivalve Families. Malacologia. 52(2): 1-184.
 Coan, E. V.; Valentich-Scott, P. (2012). Bivalve seashells of tropical West America. Marine bivalve mollusks from Baja California to northern Peru. 2 vols, 1258 pp.

External links 
 Dall, W. H. & Simpson, C. T. (1901). The Mollusca of Porto Rico. Bulletin of the United States Fish Commission. 20: 351-524, pl. 54-58
 Krylova E. M. & Sahling H. (2010). "Vesicomyidae (Bivalvia): Current Taxonomy and Distribution". PLoS ONE 5(4): e9957. 
 Krylova, E. M.; Sahling, H.; Borowski, C. (2018). Resolving the status of the families Vesicomyidae and Kelliellidae (Bivalvia: Venerida), with notes on their ecology. Journal of Molluscan Studies. 84(1): 69–91
 Bieler, R.; Mikkelsen, P. M.; Collins, T. M.; Glover, E. A.; González, V. L.; Graf, D. L.; Harper, E. M.; Healy, J.; Kawauchi, G. Y.; Sharma, P. P.; Staubach, S.; Strong, E. E.; Taylor, J. D.; Tëmkin, I.; Zardus, J. D.; Clark, S.; Guzmán, A.; McIntyre, E.; Sharp, P.; Giribet, G. (2014).  Investigating the Bivalve Tree of Life – an exemplar-based approach combining molecular and novel morphological characters. Invertebrate Systematics. 28(1): 32-115

 
Bivalve families